The Hole is an absurdist play published in 1958, written by N.F. Simpson, a British playwright associated with the Theatre of the Absurd.

Plot
"The hole is in the road. In the depths of it workmen are working. At the top, a man with a camp stool, vacuum flask, haversack, and other necessities for a long vigil is forming the nucleus of a queue. From time to time curious folk gather round and wonder what is going on below. Each gazes into the hole and sees a different significance to the events down there. Their theories are ingenious but contradictory. With the fanaticism of the scientist, the politician and the preacher, each tries to convince the others."

References

1958 plays
Theatre of the Absurd